Sir Nicholas David Coleridge  DL (born 4 March 1957) is a British former media executive, author, and cultural chair. He is chairman of the Victoria and Albert Museum, chairman of the Prince of Wales' Campaign for Wool, chairman of the Gilbert Trust for the Arts and was co-chair of HM The Queen’s Platinum Jubilee Pageant. He is an ambassador for the Landmark Trust and a patron of the Elephant Family.

From 1989 to 2019, he was successively editorial director of Condé Nast Britain, managing director, Condé Nast Britain (1991–2017), vice president, Condé Nast International and president, Condé Nast International, the division of Condé Nast which publishes 139 magazines in 27 international markets, and over 100 websites, with annual revenues of approx $1 billion. Condé Nast publishes numerous titles including Vogue, Vanity Fair, House & Garden, Tatler, The World of Interiors, Condé Nast Traveller, The New Yorker, Architectural Digest, Glamour, GQ, Brides, Wired, Love and GQ Style, as well as owning the Johansens hotel guides. Coleridge initiated the Condé Nast College of Fashion and Design in 2013, a degree-awarding academic institution in London's Soho. From 2017 to 2019, he was chairman of Condé Nast Britain.

He has been chairman of the Victoria and Albert Museum since 2015, having been a trustee from 2012 to 2015. During his tenure, the V&A has built four new museums - the £70 million V&A Dundee, the two £150 million new museums on the Olympic Park in Stratford East (V&A East and the V&A Collections Storehouse), the V&A Galleries in Shenzhen, China, plus the refurbished and rebranded Young V&A in Bethnal Green. The V&A announced record visitor numbers of 4.4 million in 2019, expanded its educational reach nationally (including to six Midlands and North-East cities), and fundraised and refurbished more than 30 galleries in South Kensington.

He has been chairman of the Campaign for Wool since 2013 (deputy chair 2008–2013). He was appointed co-chair of HM The Queen's Platinum Jubilee Pageant in February 2021, a complex event with more than 10,000 military from the UK and Commonwealth, and performers from across the nation. 

Coleridge was appointed a Knight Bachelor in the 2022 Birthday Honours for services to museums, publishing and the creative industries.

Life and career 
Coleridge was born in London, the son of David Coleridge, who was chairman of Lloyd's of London in the late 1980s and descended from a brother of poet Samuel Taylor Coleridge. He is the eldest of three brothers, and educated at Ashdown House, Eton College and Trinity College, Cambridge, where he studied theology and history of art; however, due to a back injury sustained in Iran, he was not able to sit his finals. As an Eton schoolboy, he won the Jeremy Thorpe Cup for debating with his school friend Craig Brown, though the trophy was later renamed when Thorpe's reputation fell under a shadow.

He has written fourteen books, both fiction and non-fiction, based largely upon either his professional life (The Fashion Conspiracy, Paper Tigers, With Friends Like These) or episodic novels (A Much Married Man, Godchildren, Deadly Sins, The Adventuress). The Fashion Conspiracy was the Number One bestseller, hardback non-fiction (The Times, 4 March 1988). His autobiography, titled The Glossy Years : Magazines, Museums and Selective Memoirs published September 2019 by Penguin Fig Tree, was #No 1 in Art Books, #No 1 in Fashion Books, #No 1 in Showbiz Biography. It was described by The Sunday Times as "the most entertaining book of the year".

He has been chairman of the PPA – the Professional Publishers' Association – and two-term chairman of the British Fashion Council for four years, overseeing London Fashion Week for the Department of Trade and Industry.

He was founding chairman of Fashion Rocks, the fashion and rock music extravaganza showcasing the world's eighteen top fashion designers including Dior, Chanel, Prada and Ralph Lauren paired with eighteen top rock stars including Beyoncé, Robbie Williams, Bryan Ferry and David Bowie. It raised more than £3 million for the Prince's Trust charity. He was on the advisory board for the Concert for Diana, Wembley Stadium 2007.

He has been a member of the Council of the Royal College of Art, and a member of the trading board of the Prince's Trust. He was a director of PressBof, the parent organisation of the Press Complaints Commission, 2007–2014.

While on assignment making a television documentary about Tamil terrorism in Sri Lanka in 1984, he was arrested and jailed for ten days in Welikada prison, Colombo, where he embarked upon writing a collection of short stories, '[https://www.amazon.com/How-Met-My-Wife-ebook/dp/B008BSOP04 How I Met My Wife'''].

As a journalist, he has been an irregular contributor to The Daily Telegraph, Sunday Telegraph, The Spectator and the Financial Times. In 1976, between school and university, he was a cub reporter on the Falmouth Packet newspaper in Cornwall. From 1979 to 1982 he was associate editor of the Tatler, working for then editor Tina Brown; from 1982 to 1985 he was a columnist at the Evening Standard; 1986–1989 he was editor-in-chief of Harpers & Queen magazine, a Hearst title, before joining Condé Nast.

In 2002, as chairman of the British Fashion Council, he suggested that the then Sunday Times fashion editor, Colin McDowell, was habitually too negative about British fashion designers. This drew criticism from McDowell, who accused Coleridge of jingoism.

He was described by Campaign magazine in 2012 as “magazines' most compelling advocate for almost two decades”.

 Personal life 
He is married to the healer and author Georgia Metcalfe and has four children, Alexander, Freddie, Sophie and Tommy. They live in Chelsea, London, and in Worcestershire. The December 2007 issue of Condé Nast's World of Interiors magazine contains a feature on his country house, the 1709 Wolverton Hall in Worcestershire. In 2019, he commissioned a garden folly, a 46-foot writing tower, in a Tudor-Georgian-Jacobean style, by the architect Quinlan Terry. The folly won a first prize at the 2021 Georgian Group Architectural Awards, and the Craftsmanship Prize at the 2021 British Brick Awards. 

He has seven godchildren, and his novel Godchildren was dedicated to them. Two of the godchildren, Cara Delevingne and Edie Campbell, are now well-known British models. Another of his godchildren, journalist Ned Donovan, married Princess Raiyah bint Al Hussein of Jordan.

 Honours and awards 
He was the 1982 British Press Awards Young Journalist of the Year, as a columnist at the Evening Standard'', and was given the Mark Boxer Lifetime Achievement Award for magazine journalism by the British Society of Magazine Editors in 2001. In 2013, he was awarded the Marcus Morris Lifetime Achievement Award for publishing by the Professional Publishers Association (PPA). In June 2017, he was inducted into the Professional Publishers Association's Hall of Fame by Lord Heseltine. In May 2018 he was awarded the lifetime "Outstanding Contribution to British Media" Prize at the British Media Awards.

He is the only person ever to be awarded all four of the Publishing industry’s Lifetime Achievement Awards.

Coleridge was appointed Commander of the Order of the British Empire (CBE) in the 2009 Birthday Honours and was knighted in the 2022 Birthday Honours for services to museums, publishing and the creative industries. He was appointed a Deputy Lieutenant for Worcestershire in 2022. 

A portrait of Coleridge by photographer William Teakle is in the collection of the National Portrait Gallery, London.

References

1957 births
Living people
People educated at Ashdown House
People educated at Eton College
Alumni of Trinity College, Cambridge
British male journalists
Nicholas
British media executives
Commanders of the Order of the British Empire
Knights Bachelor